Mount Liard is a peak  east of Mount Durnford in the Churchill Mountains of Antarctica. The peak was named by the Advisory Committee on Antarctic Names after Theodore J. Liard, Jr. (1918–2002), a geographer with the Department of Interior and the Department of Defense in toponymic research for the U.S. Board on Geographic Names, 1949–80. Liard was Chief of the Geographic Names Division at the Defense Mapping Agency, 1969–80.

References

Mountains of Oates Land